Huberdeau can mean:

People
 Gustave Huberdeau (1874–1945), a French operatic bass-baritone
 Jonathan Huberdeau (born 1993), Canadian ice hockey player
 Rémy Huberdeau, Canadian filmmaker
 Sébastien Huberdeau (born 1979), an actor from Quebec, Canada

Places
 Huberdeau, Quebec